The Songs 1975–1990 is a Barry Manilow compilation album released in 1990, covering (as the title suggests) 15 years of chart hits.

The album reached the top 20 of the UK sales charts in 1990, his eleventh album to achieve this feat .

Track listing

Disc 1
"I Write The Songs" (Johnston) 3:53 (1976)
"One Voice" (Manilow) 3:01 (1979)
"The Old Songs" (Pomeranz/Kaye) 4:40 (1981)
"I Don't Wanna Walk Without You" (Styne/Loesser) 3:54 (1982)
"Some Good Things Never Last (Live with Debra Byrd & Dana Robbins)" (Radice) 4:13 (1990)
"Somewhere Down The Road" (Masser/Weil/Snow) 3:56 (1983)
"When I Wanted You" (Cunico) 3:31 (1979)
"Stay (Live)" (Jolis/Di Simone/Manilow) 3:17 (1983)
"Even Now" - (Manilow/Panzer) 3:28 (1978)
"Read 'Em And Weep" (Steinman) 5:24 (1983)
"Somewhere In The Night" (Jennings/Kerr) 3:26 (1975)
"I Made It Through The Rain" (Kenny/Sheppard) 4:23 (1980)
"Daybreak" (Manilow/Anderson) 3:06 (1977)
"Please Don't Be Scared" (Sterling) 5:38 (1989)
"Looks Like We Made It" (Kerr/Jennings) 3:32 (1976)
"Some Kind Of Friend" - Not on vinyl
"Bermuda Triangle" - Not on vinyl
"This One's For You" - Not on vinyl

Disc 2
"Mandy" (English/Kerr) 3:19 (1974)
"If I Should Love Again (Live)" (Manilow) 5:18 (1981)
"All The Time" (Manilow/Panzer) 3:15 (1979)
"Copacabana (At The Copa)" (Manilow/Sussman/Feldman) 5:43 (1978)
"Keep Each Other Warm" (Hill/Sinfield) 4:37 (1989)
"Weekend In New England" (Edelman) 3:44 (1978)
"Lonely Together" (Nolan) 4:19 (1980)
"Can't Smile Without You" (Arnold/Martin/Morrow) 3:11 (1978)
"Tryin' To Get The Feeling Again" (Pomeranz) 3:41 (1978)
"Could It Be Magic" (Manilow/Anderson) 6:47 (1979)
"Brooklyn Blues" (Manilow/Sussman/Feldman) 5:08 (1987)
"Who Needs To Dream" (Manilow/Butler/Sussman/Feldman) 3:55 (1985)
"Ready To Take A Chance Again" (Fox/Gimbel) 3:01 (1978)
"If I Can Dream (Live)" (Brown) 4:41 (1990)
"Ships" - Not on vinyl
"London" - Not on vinyl

Certifications

References

1990 greatest hits albums
Barry Manilow compilation albums
Arista Records compilation albums